The 1956–57 La Liga was the 26th season since its establishment. The season started on September 9, 1956, and finished on April 21, 1957. Real Madrid won their fifth title.

Format changes
For this season, the relegation playoffs was eliminated and the two last qualified teams were directly relegated to Segunda División.

Team locations

After their promotion, España Industrial was renamed as Condal.

League table

Results

Pichichi Trophy

References
La Liga 1956/1957
Futbolme.com
All rounds in La Liga 1956/56
List of La Liga Champions

External links
 Official LFP Site

La Liga seasons
1956–57 in Spanish football leagues
Spain